Eva Fjellerup (born 30 April 1962) is a Danish fencer. She competed in the women's individual épée event at the 1996 Summer Olympics.

References

External links
 

1962 births
Living people
Danish female épée fencers
Olympic fencers of Denmark
Fencers at the 1996 Summer Olympics
People from Gentofte Municipality
Sportspeople from the Capital Region of Denmark